Iain Finlayson (19 December 1951 – 10 December 1991) was a British alpine skier. He competed in three events at the 1972 Winter Olympics.

References

1951 births
1991 deaths
British male alpine skiers
Olympic alpine skiers of Great Britain
Alpine skiers at the 1972 Winter Olympics
Place of birth missing